Eremocossus almeriana is a moth in the family Cossidae. It was described by Josef J. de Freina and Thomas Joseph Witt in 1990. It is found in south-eastern Spain.

References

Cossinae
Moths described in 1990
Moths of Europe